Fedoruk (Ukrainian: Федорук) is a Ukrainian surname. It is the Ukrainian version of the son of Theodore, and may refer to:

 Mikhail Fedoruk, mathematician
 Mykola Fedoruk, mayor of Chernivtsi
 Sylvia Fedoruk (born 1927) Canadian scientist, curler and former Lieutenant Governor of Saskatchewan.
 Todd Fedoruk (born 1979), Canadian professional ice hockey player
 Valeriy Fedoruk (born 1983), Ukrainian squash player

See also
 
Fedorchuk
Fedorenko

Ukrainian-language surnames